Norman Dennis (16 August 1929 – 13 November 2010) was a British sociologist.

Born one of four sons to a tram driver, Norman Dennis was educated at Bede Collegiate Boys' School and was offered a place at Corpus Christi College, Oxford, but declined it in favour of the London School of Economics, where he achieved a first class honours degree in economics. He held academic posts at Leeds, Bristol and Birmingham before finally holding a long-term post as a lecturer and reader in Social Studies at Newcastle University. He worked there for 35 years.

He was a lifelong Labour supporter and was a Labour councillor in Millfield in Sunderland in the early 1970s. He was driven to do this by his disgust at the planned slum clearances in Sunderland at the time, which he opposed strongly. It was this that also inspired him to write about economic pressures and how they shape society.

The Daily Telegraph news blogger, Ed West, described Dennis as "a key analyst of late 20th-century British society whose influence, I suspect, will stretch long into the 21st".

Dennis died of leukaemia on 13 November 2010 in Sunderland, at 81.

Bibliography
Coal Is Our Life - An Analysis of a Yorkshire Mining Community (1956)
People and Planning (Society Today & Tomorrow) (1970)
Public Participation and Planner's Blight (1972)
English Ethical Socialism: Thomas More to R.H. Tawney (with A.H. Halsey) (1988)
Families Without Fatherhood (1992)
Rising Crime and the Dismembered Family (1993)
The Invention of Permanent Poverty (1997)
Racist Murder and Pressure Group Politics (2000)
Cultures and Crimes: Policing in Four Nations (2005)

Notes

External links 
 Obituary in The Journal

1929 births
2010 deaths
Alumni of the London School of Economics
People from Sunderland
British sociologists
Labour Party (UK) councillors
Academics of the University of Leeds
Academics of the University of Bristol
Academics of the University of Birmingham
Academics of Newcastle University
Deaths from leukemia
Councillors in Tyne and Wear